Luca Banchi (born August 1, 1965) is an Italian professional basketball coach. He is currently the head coach of SIG Strasbourg of the French LNB Pro A and the Latvia men's national basketball team.

Club coaching career

Italy
Banchi began working as a basketball coach in the youth teams of Basketball Grosseto, after which he was an assistant coach for the Armed Forces Vigna di Valle, and Affrico Firenze. Between 1987 and 1999, he coached the junior teams of Livorno, winning three consecutive youth national titles in the period, from 1995 to 1997.

He was then promoted to head coach of Basket Livorno, in the Italian second-tier level Serie A2. In 1999, he made his debut on the bench of Pall Trieste, where he coached for two years, before returning to Livorno, that had meanwhile been promoted to the Italian top-tier level LBA. He followed that up with two stops in the Italian 2nd Division, in Trapani and Aurora Basket Jesi.

In 2006, he became the assistant coach of Montepaschi Siena, under head coach Simone Pianigiani. As an assistant with Montepaschi, he won six 6 Italian League championships in a row (2007–2012), five Italian Super Cups (2007–2011), and four Italian Cups (2009–2012). In June 2012, he took over the role of head coach of Montepaschi Siena, following the departure of Simone Pianigiani to Fenerbahçe. On February 10, 2013, he won the Italian Cup, after defeating Pallacanestro Varese, by a score of 77–74 in the final game. On June 19, 2013, he also won his first Italian League championship, as a head coach.

On July 1, 2013, he signed a two-year deal to become the head coach of the Italian European-wide top-tier level EuroLeague club, Emporio Armani Milano. In his first season with the team, he won the Italian League championship, repeating the previous success of Carlo Recalcati, as the only head coaches who won consecutive Italian League titles, with different teams.

In the 2017–18 season, he was the head coach of the European-wide second-tier level EuroCup team, Auxulium Torino.

Germany
In 2018, Banchi became the head coach of the German club Brose Bamberg, of the German top-tier level Basketball Bundesliga (BBL), and the EuroLeague.

Greece
On 1 July 2018, Banchi was appointed as the head coach of AEK Athens of the Greek Basket League (GBL) and FIBA Champions League (BCL). On June 17, 2019 his contracted at AEK Athens was terminated.

Russia
On July 5, 2019, he has signed with Lokomotiv Kuban of the VTB United League.  On November 15, 2019, his contract with Kuban has been terminated.

Coaching record

EuroLeague

|- 
| align="left"|Montepaschi
| align="left"|2012–13
| 24 || 12 || 12 ||  || align="center"|Eliminated in Top 16 stage
|- 
| align="left"|Milano
| align="left"|2013–14
| 28 || 16 || 12 ||  || align="center"|Eliminated in quarterfinals
|- 
| align="left"|Milano
| align="left"|2014–15
| 24 || 9 || 15 ||  || align="center"|Eliminated in Top 16 stage
|- 
| align="left"|Bamberg
| align="left"|2017–18
| 6 || 2 || 4 ||  || align="center"|Eliminated in regular season
|-class="sortbottom"
| align="center" colspan=2|Career||82||39||43||||

References

External links
 Luca Banchi at euroleague.net
 Luca Banchi at legabasket.it 

1965 births
Living people
Aurora Basket Jesi coaches
Auxilium Pallacanestro Torino coaches
Basket Livorno coaches
Brose Baskets coaches
Italian basketball coaches
Mens Sana Basket coaches
Olimpia Milano coaches
Pallacanestro Trapani coaches
Pallacanestro Trieste coaches
Victoria Libertas Pesaro coaches